Ángel Eduardo Viadero Odriozola (born 3 January 1969) is a Spanish football coach, who is currently in charge of Lleida Esportiu.

He spent the great majority of his career managing in Segunda División B, leading both Racing Santander and their reserves in the league.

Career
Viadero was born in Santander, Cantabria. He began his managerial career in the reserve team of hometown club Racing de Santander, twice being relegated from Segunda División B but both times winning promotion instantly back from Tercera División. In June 2008, he switched to SD Ponferradina on a one-year contract, also in the third division.

In February 2009, Viadero was dismissed from Ponfe, despite the side sitting in third and therefore in the promotion play-off places. He returned to work in July at SD Eibar, but was replaced by the returning Manix Mandiola in late April 2010. Weeks later he was confirmed at Pontevedra CF for the new season, losing seven of his first ten matches and his job in October.

After taking SD Noja to promotion and then consolidation in the third tier, Viadero joined Sestao River Club in June 2013. In his first season in the Basque Country, the side won their group but were eliminated 3–2 on aggregate by Gimnàstic de Tarragona in the play-off semi-finals. Following two full campaigns at the club and Burgos CF, he withdrew from his two contracted years at the latter and returned to Racing, being named manager of their first team, now in division three.

Days after being denied a first career promotion to Segunda División via a 4–1 play-off final loss to FC Barcelona B, Viadero was given a second year in the hotseat at the Estadio El Sardinero on 30 June 2017. The following 4 February he was sacked, with fans turning against him as they trailed leaders Sporting de Gijón B by eight points.

On 12 August 2019, Viadero accepted his first foreign job, taking the reins at Moroccan Botola club Moghreb Tétouan for the upcoming season. He lost his job the following 28 February after a seven-game winless run for the 8th-placed club.

Remaining in North Africa, Viadero was hired at third-tier Spanish club UD Melilla on 13 January 2021. He signed to the end of the season.

On 3 February 2023, after more than a year without a club, Viadero was named manager at Lleida Esportiu until the end of the season- following the departure of Toni Seligrat; who departed to become assistant coach at La Liga side Valencia.

Managerial statistics

Honours

Manager
Racing B
Tercera División: 2004–05
Tercera División play-off winner: 2007–08

Noja
Tercera División: 2011–12

References

External links

Soccerway profile

Spanish football managers
Segunda División B managers
Sestao River managers
SD Eibar managers
Racing de Santander managers
Burgos CF managers
Moghreb Tétouan managers
Lleida Esportiu managers
1969 births
Living people
Sportspeople from Santander, Spain
Spanish expatriate football managers
Expatriate football managers in Morocco
Spanish expatriate sportspeople in Morocco